Raymond A. "Babe" Curfman (June 16, 1915 – April 5, 1993) was an American football player and coach.  He was the head coach at the New Mexico College of Agriculture and Mechanic Arts in Las Cruces (now New Mexico State University), from 1946 to 1947 and at the University of Idaho in Moscow from 1951 to 1953, compiling a career college football record .

Coaching career
After a brief stay as a player with the Brooklyn Dodgers of the National Football League (NFL) in 1938, Curfman coached at the high school level in Texas and New Mexico, at Tulia, Santa Rosa, and Las Cruces. His 1942 Las Cruces basketball team advanced to the state finals. Curfman served as a lieutenant in the Army Air Corps in World War II.

From 1946 to 1947, Curfman was the head coach at New Mexico A&M, then in the Border Conference, where he compiled an  record. He resigned in December to work in the sporting goods industry in Texas, then joined the staff of third-year head coach Dixie Howell at Idaho in  Two years later, Howell and Curfman submitted their resignations in March 1951, and Curfman remained on campus as an interim coach for the upcoming 1951 spring drills. The administration was impressed with his handling of the team during the first week of practice and hired him as head coach in mid-April. He guided the Vandals for three seasons in the Pacific Coast Conference and compiled a  record. His salary in his final year at Idaho in 1953 

Curfman made headlines during the 1953 season as his overmatched Vandals struggled in conference play in the PCC. Following his resignation as Idaho head coach in December, he was hired as the business manager for the Spokane Indians minor league baseball team in January 1954.

He later coached high school football back in Texas, at Pampa (1958–1961) and Pecos (1962–1964).

Curfman died at age 77 in 1993 in Tucson, Arizona; he and his wife are buried at the East Lawn Palms Cemetery in Tucson.

Head coaching record

References

External links
 1952 Gem of the Mountains, University of Idaho yearbook – Babe Curfman
 

1915 births
1993 deaths
American football ends
American football quarterbacks
Idaho Vandals football coaches
New Mexico State Aggies athletic directors
New Mexico State Aggies football coaches
Texas Tech Red Raiders football players
High school football coaches in New Mexico
High school football coaches in Texas
United States Army Air Forces personnel of World War II
United States Army Air Forces officers